Salinas Elementary School may refer to:

 Salinas Elementary School (Laredo, Texas)
 Salinas Elementary School (Universal City, Texas)